The Rus'–Byzantine Treaty of 911 is the most comprehensive and detailed treaty concluded between the Byzantine Empire and Kievan Rus in the 10th century. It was preceded by the preliminary treaty of 907. It is considered the earliest written source of Old Russian Law.

The text of the document, incorporated into the Primary Chronicle, has many affinities in content and phrasing with the trade treaties later concluded by Byzantium with the merchant republics of Italy. It was composed in two languages and signed personally by Emperor Leo VI. The text also includes speeches of the parties on the occasion. No treaties of comparable complexity and antiquity are known among the other societies in Europe of that time.

The treaty opens with a lengthy enumeration of the Rus' envoys (attested or reconstructed Old Norse forms in parentheses): Farlof (Farulfr), Ver/lemud (Vermu(n)dr), Rulav (Rollabʀ), Fost (*Fastuʀ), Frelavc (Frilleifr), Inegeld (Ingjaldr), Karly (Karli), Karn (Karna, attested in a Swedish runic inscription), Lidul(f) (Lidulif < Leiðulfr, but litulf is attested from a runic inscription), Ruald (Hróaldr), Rjuar (Hróarr), Truan (Þróndr or Þrandr).

Article 1 proclaims the "solid and durable" friendship between Rus' and Greeks, and provides that the Rus' will never cause any damage to the Greeks and vice-versa. 
The articles 3 to 7 regulate criminal law and the life of their colony at Constantinople. There is also a proviso on inheritance of a merchant who died in the imperial capital. The article 8 is dedicated to maritime law. The following articles enlarge on ransom of captives, exchange of criminals, and the status of the Varangian mercenaries in Byzantine service.

See also
Trade route from the Varangians to the Greeks

References

Bibliography
 Повесть временных лет, ч. 1–2, М.—Л., 1950.
Memorials of Russian Law. Issue 1: Memorials of Law of Kievan State 10th-12th centuries / Aleksandr Zimin. Moscow, 1952. (  Памятники русского права. Вып. 1: Памятники права Киевского государства X–XII вв. / Сост. А.А. Зимин. М., 1952).
 Fyodor Uspensky. The History of the Byzantine Empire, vol. 2. Moscow: Mysl, 1997.

 Sverrir Jakobsson, The Varangians: In God’s Holy Fire (Palgrave Macmillan, 2020), pp. 38–41.

911
Treaties of the Byzantine Empire
Byzantine Treaty 911
10th-century treaties
Byzantine Treaty 911
910s in the Byzantine Empire
10th century in Kievan Rus'